Hans Podlipnik Castillo (born 9 January 1988) is a Chilean retired tennis player of Slovenian descent. His best results are in doubles, winning one ATP World Tour and reaching another final in this category, besides from winning 19 Challengers and 29 Futures. In singles, he won 23 Futures and reaching in 2015 the final in the Poprad-Tatry Challenger.

Since 2015, Podlipnik focused his career on doubles, ranking No. 43 in February 2018. He finished the 2014 season as the Chilean top singles player, ranked No. 196. and again in 2015 as No. 167. He reached his best singles ranking in August 2015, at no. 157. In November 2019, after his participation with the Chile Davis Cup Team at the 2019 Davis Cup Finals, he announced his retirement.

ATP career finals

Doubles: 2 (1 title, 1 runner-up)

Challenger and Futures finals

Singles: 36 (23–13)

Doubles: 74 (49–25)

References

Doubles performance timeline

External links 
 
 
 
 
 
 
 

Chilean male tennis players
Chilean people of Slovenian descent
Tennis players from Santiago
1988 births
Living people
Tennis players at the 2015 Pan American Games
Pan American Games gold medalists for Chile
Olympic tennis players of Chile
Tennis players at the 2016 Summer Olympics
Pan American Games medalists in tennis
South American Games medalists in tennis
South American Games silver medalists for Chile
Competitors at the 2006 South American Games
Medalists at the 2015 Pan American Games